Karl Krenauer (born 9 March 1959) is an Austrian former cyclist. He competed in the team time trial and the individual pursuit events at the 1984 Summer Olympics.

References

External links
 

1959 births
Living people
Austrian male cyclists
Olympic cyclists of Austria
Cyclists at the 1984 Summer Olympics
People from Neusiedl am See District
Sportspeople from Burgenland
20th-century Austrian people